Lahore Badshahs was one of the nine teams that competed in the 2008 and 2008/09 competition of the defunct Indian Cricket League (ICL). The captain was former Pakistani captain and batsman Inzamam-ul-Haq. The team made its ICL debut on 11 March 2008 in a match against the winners of the previous version, the Chennai Superstars.

The Lahore Badshahs team was unique within the ICL as it was solely composed of Pakistani players who have previously played for their National team.

"Badshah" is a Persian word, also used in Urdu, which translates to King or Emperor

Previous performance
 They are only Pakistani club team to win any international club tournament since the International 20:20 Club Championship, won by Faisalabad Wolves.

References 

Indian Cricket League teams
Cricket clubs established in 2008
Cricket in Lahore
Former senior cricket clubs of Pakistan
Badshas
2008 establishments in Pakistan
2009 disestablishments in Pakistan